Poul Andersen (2 January 1930 – 30 December 1995) was a Danish footballer who competed in the 1960 Summer Olympics.

References

1930 births
1995 deaths
Association football defenders
Danish men's footballers
Olympic footballers of Denmark
Footballers at the 1960 Summer Olympics
Olympic silver medalists for Denmark
Olympic medalists in football
Medalists at the 1960 Summer Olympics
Skovshoved IF players